Czyżówka may refer to:

Czyżówka, Chrzanów County in Lesser Poland Voivodeship (south Poland)
Czyżówka, Gorlice County in Lesser Poland Voivodeship (south Poland)
Czyżówka, Masovian Voivodeship (east-central Poland)
Czyżówka, Warmian-Masurian Voivodeship (north Poland)